Divine worship or Divine Worship may refer to:
 Worship of God or gods
 Christian worship in particular
 Liturgy, customary public worship performed by a religious group
 Christian liturgy in particular
 Anglican Use, rite of formerly Anglican, personal ordinariate parishes in the Catholic Church
 Book of Divine Worship, former missal for the personal ordinariates
 Divine Worship: The Missal, standard missal for the personal ordinariates
 Divine Worship: Daily Office, Divine Office for the personal ordinariates
 Congregation for Divine Worship and the Discipline of the Sacraments, dicastery of the Roman Curia

See also
 Divine Office (disambiguation)
 Divine Service (disambiguation)